Prince Barrie (born 18 August 1997) is a Sierra Leonean footballer who plays as a striker for Bo Rangers and the Sierra Leone national team.

References

External links

1997 births
Living people
Sierra Leonean footballers
Sierra Leone international footballers
People from Freetown
Association football forwards
F.C. Kallon players
International Allies F.C. players
Hafia FC players
Bo Rangers F.C. players
2021 Africa Cup of Nations players